Reuben Daniel Armstrong (born March 29, 1980 in Shawnee Mission, Kansas) better known by his stage name Bonyx and RUBONYX, is an American producer and R&B artist. Best known for his production, working with independent artists Tech N9ne and Skatterman & Snug Brim. He produced Skatterman & Snug Brim's single, "Block Party," which charted #24 on Billboard's Hot R&B/Hip-Hop Singles Sales chart.

Career
At the age of 17, Armstrong started to attend a local Kansas City studio called Faculty Sound. During his days at Faculty Sound he was introduced to the music industry and learned the business through associates, Godren T. Duckett, Theodis Brown, and Vonzell & Adrian Washington, etc. Armstrong produced a variety of beats for local rap & R&B artists including “Boy Big” a.k.a. Big Boy Levar and associate producer, Tom Woosley of Woo Woo Productions, with his first underground LP, All Sides.

In his days with Faculty Sound, Armstrong was introduced to various music players including Suge Knight’s brother, Big Wes Crockett. Faculty Sound eventually folded due to improper business management.

Tekneko Bros.

Armstrong, along with his younger brother, William ‘Dee’ Armstrong, had met Antonio ‘Elmo’ Wesley at Faculty Sound, and the three of them decided to join forces and start Tekneko Bros. production team.

In 2001 Armstrong was contacted by Aaron ‘Tech N9ne’ Yates and Travis O’Guinn, about producing on Yates’ Absolute Power album. Armstrong along with Tekneko produced 7 of the 23 tracks, including one of the singles, "Imma Tell." Tekneko also produced albums for Strange Music artists, Kutt Calhoun and Skatterman & Snug Brim which included Skatterman & Snug Brim's single, "Block Party." Through Yates and the Strange Music label, Armstrong along with Tekneko were introduced and worked with several other artists including Bubba Sparxxx and Big V from Nappy Roots.

Recent career moves

Currently, Armstrong has expanded his horizons in not only composing, engineering and graphic arts, but also in directing local music videos with film companies such as: GMF Films, SKILYNE RECORDINGS formally YANEZ Entertainment, and Fylmwerks. Armstrong is finishing a project with up-and-coming hip-hop sensation GGL3, whose album is titled The Weekend. He is also putting the finishing touches on his first solo R&B album entitled Nightlife, which is scheduled to release in 2009.

Production discography

Documentary DVD

2004: Tech N9ne – T9X: The Tech N9ne Experience

Music videos
2007: “Jelly Bounce” by Mr. Jellybounce, MAG & Young Slim
2007: “Parkin’ Lot Pimpin’” by Royalty ft. Bonyx
2008: “What It Is” by Kredulous ft. 3rd Degree
2008: “Lovin’ It” by A-Squad / 211 M.G.I.
2008: “Get Faded” by KALAB
2008: “My Star” by RJ ft. Bonyx
2009: "Drunk Game" B4 and GGL3

References

Living people
1980 births
American hip hop record producers
Musicians from Kansas
People from Johnson County, Kansas